David van der Poel (born 15 June 1992) is a Belgian-born Dutch road and cyclo-cross cyclist, who currently rides for UCI ProTeam .

He represented his nation in the men's elite event at the 2016 UCI Cyclo-cross World Championships in Heusden-Zolder. 

He is the son of the Dutch cyclist Adri van der Poel, brother of Mathieu van der Poel and grandson of the French cyclist Raymond Poulidor.

Major results

Cyclo-cross

2014–2015
 1st Pétange
 1st Bussnang
 2nd National Championships
 National Trophy Series
2nd Milton Keynes
 2nd Contern
 EKZ CrossTour
3rd Eschenbach
 3rd Lutterbach
2015–2016
 EKZ CrossTour
1st Hittnau
 Toi Toi Cup
1st Tabor
 3rd National Championships
2016–2017
 Toi Toi Cup
1st Slany
 1st Jingle Cross
2017–2018
 Toi Toi Cup
1st Kolin
3rd Slany
 1st Mol
 1st Rucphen
 1st Radcross
 1st Lutterbach
 Brico Cross
2nd Maldegem
 EKZ CrossTour
2nd Eschenbach
2nd Meilen
 2nd Woerden
 Superprestige
3rd Hoogstraten
 3rd National Championships
 3rd Oostmalle
 3rd Hasselt
2018–2019
 1st Overall EKZ CrossTour
1st Baden
1st Hittnau
2nd Aigle
 1st Radcross
 1st Lutterbach
 Brico Cross
3rd Essen
 3rd Gullegem
 3rd Neerpelt
 3rd Poprad
2019–2020
 1st Vittel
 EKZ CrossTour
2nd Meilen
2nd Hittnau
 2nd Troyes
 3rd Mol
2020–2021
 1st Troyes
2021–2022
 Copa de España
1st Karrantza
2nd Pontevedra
2nd Llodio
 2nd Ardooie
 2nd Xaxancx
 2nd Elorrio
2022–2023
 Exact Cross
3rd Zonnebeke

Road
2017
 8th Velothon Wales
2018
 1st Stage 1 Tour Alsace
 6th Schaal Sels
2019
 1st Prologue (TTT) Tour Alsace

References

External links

1992 births
Living people
Cyclo-cross cyclists
Dutch male cyclists
Cyclists from Antwerp
People from Wilrijk
Dutch people of French descent
Belgian male cyclists
Belgian people of French descent
Belgian people of Dutch descent